The 2014 African Fencing Championships were held in Cairo, Egypt from 20 to 24 June.

Medal summary

Men's events

Women's events
Two nations only, Egypt and Algeria, entered a team in women's foil.

Medal table

References

2014
African Fencing Championships
International fencing competitions hosted by Egypt
African Fencing Championships
African Fencing Championships